CABC may refer to:
Canadian American Business Council
Cardiff Athletic Bowls Club, Welsh sports club
China-Africa Business Council
Contemporary Artists' Books Conference
Convention of Atlantic Baptist Churches, now Canadian Baptists of Atlantic Canada